New Manila International Airport , also known as Bulacan International Airport, is an international airport under construction on the coastal areas of Bulakan, Bulacan,  north of the capital Manila. The project was proposed by the San Miguel Corporation (SMC) and is set to help decongest Ninoy Aquino International Airport (NAIA), the main gateway to the capital for air travelers. The airport is a part of the flagship "Build! Build! Build!" infrastructure program of the Rodrigo Duterte administration.

The proposed airport will be built on a  coastal property as part of an envisioned  township that features a residential zone, government center, seaport and an industrial zone. The ₱735.634-billion airport development will cover the passenger terminal building with airside and landside facilities as well as an airport toll road and railway.

The groundbreaking of the new airport began on October 14, 2020, and the actual construction of the first phase of construction on the project, which includes the two runways and the terminal buildings of the new airport began on March 18, 2022. It is planned to be finished by 2026.

History

Background 

As early as the 1980s, there has been recognition of the constraints to expanding the capacity of Manila International Airport (now Ninoy Aquino International Airport) and its continued ability to handle the projected growth in aircraft movements and passenger traffic.

In May 2011, the Japan International Cooperation Agency (JICA) submitted to the Philippine government a study concerning air transport needs within the Greater Manila Area, which concluded that the development of a new gateway airport was "an urgent need" given that the runway capacity at the existing Ninoy Aquino International Airport (NAIA) was "already almost saturated." In response, the government adopted a dual airport system in May 2013, which entailed the upgrade of the facilities at Ninoy Aquino International Airport while also expanding capacity at Clark International Airport. JICA later recommended the construction of a new airport in the vicinity of Sangley Point, Cavite City and conducted a full feasibility study.

Meanwhile, competing proposals from San Miguel Corporation headed by Ramon Ang and the All-Asia Resources and Reclamation Corporation (ARRC) venture headed by Henry Sy were submitted to the national government by 2013. However, the Aquino administration rejected the unsolicited proposals, stating that they "spark controversies" that detract from the "open, transparent bidding" they intended for the project. This would be later reversed by the succeeding administration, which expressed interest in developing multiple airports for the Greater Manila Area.

In February 2017, San Miguel Corporation proposed the construction of an airport with two parallel  runways under a BOT scheme. The National Economic and Development Authority (NEDA) Board approved the unsolicited proposal on April 26, 2018 and negotiation report on the Concession Agreement (CA) on December 21, 2018. Under the approved terms, the concession agreement includes a no government guarantee or any form of subsidy from the state.

SMC president and CEO Ramon Ang said the projects, which would be wholly funded by the firm with no government guarantees or subsidies, will improve the lives of more Filipinos by promoting numerous industries and creating millions of quality jobs around the country.

Development 
After the project's approval by NEDA, the project had its final review of the Office of the Solicitor-General (OSG) and the Department of Finance (DOF) before it undergone a Swiss challenge where other prospective companies will compete against the San Miguel Corporation proposal. As the original project proponent, SMC has the right to match any bid by its competitors. The Department of Transportation, the implementing agency for the project, aimed to finish Swiss challenge by the first quarter of 2019. The Swiss challenge period ended with no rival bids on July 31, 2019. With this, SMC was expected to be awarded the project.

On September 18, 2019, San Miguel Corporation, through its unit, San Miguel Aerocity Inc. was awarded a  deal to oversee, then hand over the project by the Department of Transportation after both firms signed a concession agreement for the building of the new airport at the ASEAN Convention Center in Clark Freeport Zone. The airport will be fully owned by the Philippine government under a build-operate-transfer program. DOTr allowed the SMC unit to build, maintain, and operate the airport without funding from the government for a set period of time. Its groundbreaking was supposed to begin in December.

On September 1, 2020, Congress approved House Bill No. 7507, granting the San Miguel Aerocity a 50-year congressional franchise "to establish a domestic and international airport", and to "develop an adjacent airport city". Its construction was expected to begin in October of the same year. House Bill No. 7507 lapsed into law as Republic Act No. 11506 on December 20, 2020, records from the House of Representatives showed, after President Rodrigo Duterte failed to sign the bill within the 30-day period given for Malacañang's review.

Upon its approval, some groups raised concerns about the environmental impact of the project, and that the project may intensify flooding in the areas adjacent to the airport. The presence of mangrove forests in the area were also noted. Agham, an environmental science advocacy group, advocated that the Environmental Clearance Certificate issued by the Department of Environment and Natural Resources be revoked. On October 8, 2019, Pamalakaya national chairman and former Anakpawis representative Fernando Hicap requested that then House Speaker Alan Peter Cayetano conduct a congressional inquiry on the airport project and its potential adverse impacts. Some environmental issues remain unaddressed although SMC has clarified that some of their activities, such as the dredging of the Tullahan River in Metro Manila, may alleviate flooding issues. Engineering interventions will also be used to mitigate flooding.

Pamalakaya-Bulacan spokesperson Rodel Alvarez also claimed that there was a lack of relocation plan for the residents and fishermen who would be potentially affected by the project. The DENR denied that local fishermen will be affected, as the lands that will be used are from private landowners. On 30 September 2020, San Miguel Corporation launched its skills and livelihood training for relocation of residents affected by the project.

The scheduled groundbreaking in December 2019 faced a delay, which according to DOTr secretary Arthur Tugade was due to an issue over the "wording and interpretation" of the concession agreement with the SMC. The issue covered conditions on material adverse government action, which is concerned with the compensation to the concessionaire in the event the project is adversely affected by the actions of the national government, and on caps on liabilities of the government. Nevertheless, DOTr stated these delays were temporary and the project would still go on after reviews conducted by the Department of Justice (DOJ).

In connection to the airport's development, Congress passed House Bill No. 7575 creating an economic zone and freeport covering the airport's vicinity. However, on July 1, 2022, the bill was vetoed by President Bongbong Marcos over fiscal risks, incoherence with existing laws, and the proposed economic zone's location near the Clark Freeport and Special Economic Zone.

Construction 
San Miguel Corporation tapped three international firms, Groupe ADP Ingénierie, Meinhardt Group and Jacobs Engineering Group (the same builders behind Singapore Changi Airport, Hartsfield–Jackson Atlanta International Airport, and Charles de Gaulle Airport) to build and design the airport. By June 2021, preparatory work was in progress, with the land development project expected to be completed by the end of 2024.

Airport facilities
The proposed airport will feature at least four runways, expandable to six. It will have a capacity of 200 million passengers per year when fully built, which is about six times larger than the current capacity of NAIA. The first phase of the project will include two of the four runways.

It will also be connected to Metro Manila by an airport toll road with connections to the North Luzon Expressway and Radial Road 10. The airport will also be connected by rail to the MRT Line 7 through the MRT 7 Airport Express project.

See also
 List of airports in the Greater Manila Area
 Clark International Airport
 Ninoy Aquino International Airport
 Sangley Point Airport
 Subic Bay International Airport

Notes

References

External links
 New Manila International Airport Project - Public-Private Partnership Center
 New Manila International Airport - Resource page with project information and historical news archive.

Proposed airports in the Philippines
Transportation in Metro Manila
Transportation in Bulacan
Buildings and structures in Bulacan